Oscar Wenderoth (1871–1938) was an American architect  who served as director of the Office of the Supervising Architect from 1912 to 1915. He is identified as the architect of many government buildings built during that period, including some listed on the National Register of Historic Places.

Wenderoth was born in Philadelphia in 1871 and was the son of the noted photographer Frederick August Wenderoth, a pioneer "...in addressing the public's desire for colored photographs." Early in his architectural career Oscar worked for the New York City firm of Carrere and Hastings. He first joined the Office of Supervising Architect as a senior architectural draftsman in 1897, working in the office for three separate time periods before being appointed as its director.

He was appointed to the directorship by President William Howard Taft in 1912. He resigned in 1915 without providing a public explanation of his resignation. Soon after his resignation he joined Weary & Alford in Chicago as Supervising Architect, where he worked for five years. In the ensuing years his sight failed, leading to blindness and retirement in 1920. He died in 1938 in New York City.

Selected government buildings

References

20th-century American architects
1871 births
1938 deaths
Architects from Philadelphia
19th-century American architects
United States Department of the Treasury officials
Taft administration personnel